Rewa is a city in the north-eastern part of Madhya Pradesh state in India. It is the administrative center of Rewa District and Rewa Division. The maximum length of Rewa district is 125 km from east to west and the length of Rewa from north to south is 96 km. This area is surrounded by Kaimur hills to the south  Vindhyachal ranges pass through the middle of the district. It is famous for the founding of the world’s first white tiger safari and beetle nut toys.

History

The district of Rewa derives its name from the town of Rewa, the district headquarters, which is another name for the Narmada River.

Present day Rewa was part of the Baghelkhand region which expanded from the present day Prayagraj in the North to Ratanpur in the South, Jabalpur in the West to Surajpur in the East.

Baghel Dynasty 
Baghel Dynasty was founded by Bhimaldev (son of Vyaghradev, the chieftain of Vyaghrapalli) in 1236 CE. Baghelas are basically Chalukyans of Anhilwara (Gujarat).

The region was earlier governed by Lodhi and Sengar chieftains of Rajgond Dynasty. Lodhi's Diwan Tiwari conspired with Baghelas and assisted in foundation of Baghela Rule in the Gahora Patti region. In return of this favour, Baghelas granted title of "Singh Tiwari" or "Adhrajiya Tiwari" to the Diwan Tiwari.

Raja Ramchandra shifted capital to Bandhavgarh, and later Raja Vikramjit Singh shifted capital to Rewa in 1605 CE.

Bandhavgarh Fort was sieged by Mughals. Tansen and Birbal (Mahesh Das) were in court of Ramchandra Singh Baghel.

Raghuraj Singh Baghel built Govindgarh Fort, which lies in between Govindgarh lake. Govindgarh is famous for its exquisite varieties of mangoes.

Raja Gulab Singh was called "social reformer King" of Rewa. Raja Martand Singh was the last Baghela Ruler. Later, the state joined the Union of India, after independence.

Revolt of 1857 
Thakur Ranmat Singh of Mankahri revolted against the British and was hanged in 1859.

Demographics 
As of 2011, Rewa had a population of about 2,35,654 out of which 1,24,012 are males and 1,11,642 are females. Rewa has an average literacy rate of 86.31%, male literacy is 91.67%, and female literacy is 80.40%. In Rewa, 10.76% of the population is under 6 years old.

Society 
The region is home to Kol Tribes of Madhya Pradesh. Rewa Riyasat had gave royal patronage to three Brahmins, today known as Tiwari, Mishra and Dubey (Parauha). These three formed closed matrimonial alliances.

Tiwari had assisted Vyaghra Singh Deo Baghel and his sons to orchestrate Coup d'état of Lodhis and ascend the throne of Rewa Estate. In return of the favor, Tiwari and his successors called "Adhrajiya Tiwari" with title of "Singh Tiwari". The other known Tiwari clans are - Tiwani, Hanna etc.

Mishras belong to four clans - Amanv (Chakghat), Anjora (Teonthar), Umapur (Prayagraj) and Tudihar (Mirzapur). Last brahmin to receive royal patronage was - Parauha, which used title Dubey or Dwivedi. Some other major Brahmin clans of Rewa are - Shukla, Gautam, Garg, Pandey, Tripathi etc.

Kurmi people are landed wealthy agriculturalists of the region with expertise in mango, tobacco, linseed and rice cultivation.

Cuisine 
The region has highest production of pulses, tobacco, mangoes, flaxseeds, Mahua etc. Thus, cuisines enjoyed by people are -

 Indrahar - paste of several pulses mixed and baked in steam
 Kadhi - kadhi uses Rasaj (gram flour cakes), Sooran (elephant foot yam) and Indrahar
 Bagza - aam kery pana with toppings of gram flour spaghettis and fried with cumin and mustard
 Kusuli - regional variation of Guziya sweet
 Dal Poori - breads filled with grinded Gram Dal and spices like - Garlic, Garam Masala etc.
 Nimona - peas or green grams fine grinded and fried to curry masala
 Sattu - fine grinded popcorns of wheat, gram and barley
 Mahua Poori - pooris used with fillings of sun dried ripen Mahua fruits

Transportation

Rail
Rewa railway station is connected to Satna through the 50 km Satna-Rewa branch line. Satna falls on the Howrah-Allahabad-Mumbai line.

Road & air
The highways crossing through the city are NH 7, NH 27, and NH 75 NH 30.

The closest major airport to Rewa is Prayagraj Airport, Uttar Pradesh which is 130 kilometers (80.7 miles) away and has flights to major destinations such as Delhi, Bengaluru, Mumbai, Kolkata, etc. Other airports are at Chorahta Airport Rewa, Khajuraho, Jabalpur and Varanasi. Rewa will soon have its own domestic airport which is under construction and scheduled to get open by 2023 end.

References

External links
Official Government Website of Rewa
Website of Rewa Tourism

 
 Cities and towns in Rewa district
 Former capital cities in India
 Cities in Madhya Pradesh

 Rewa Municipal Corporation